Edward Jessup (December24, 1735February3, 1816), together with his brother Ebenezer Jessup (July 1739 – 1818), was a large landowner in present-day New York State before the American Revolution, and later a soldier and political figure in Upper Canada, now the present-day Canadian province of Ontario, Canada.

Early life
Edward Jessup was born in Stamford, Fairfield County, Connecticut Colony, British North America, British Empire, on December 24, 1735, and moved with his family, to Dutchess County, New York, in 1744.

French and Indian War
In 1759, during the French and Indian War, Edward Jessup served under the leadership of British general Jeffery Amherst in the Lake Champlain region. Following the war, in 1764, he moved with his brother, Ebenezer, to Albany County, New York, where they established a community, known as Jessup's Landing, on the Hudson River. In addition, in 1771,  the Jessup brothers purchased  in Hamilton County, New York from the Mohawk people in the "Totten and Crossfield Purchase" for three pence an acre. The "Jessup River" and associated "Jessup River Wild Forest" in Hamilton County are named after the Jessup brothers.

American Revolutionary War
In 1776, with other loyalists from this area, they joined Sir John Johnson's regiment, later forming their own corps, known as the King's Loyal Americans. They fought with Lieutenant General John Burgoyne at Saratoga and both brothers were taken prisoner. They were paroled and allowed to return to Quebec. In 1781, Edward Jessup was named head of a new provincial regiment known as the Loyal Rangers, or Jessup's Rangers, which mainly maintained garrisons in southern Quebec and occasionally took part in raids into New York state.

Life in Canada 
After the war, Edward Jessup and his troops settled along the Saint Lawrence River; he himself settled in Augusta Township. He was appointed justice of the peace and a judge of the Court of Common Pleas. With his son, he founded the town of Prescott, Ontario.

Family
His son, Edward Jr., was elected to the 2nd Parliament of Upper Canada representing Grenville and became a lieutenant-colonel in the local militia. His grandson, Edward, was elected to the 11th Parliament of Upper Canada for Grenville.

Later life and death
Later in life, Edward Jessup suffered from the palsy and died, on February 3, 1816, in Prescott, Province of Upper Canada, British Canada, British Empire, now Prescott, Ontario, Canada, in 1816, aged 80.

References

Further reading
Watt, Gavin K., A Service History and Master Roll of Major Edward Jessup's Loyal Rangers , (Ottawa, Ontario, Global Heritage Press, 2017).

External links 
Biography at the Dictionary of Canadian Biography Online
Col. Edward Jessup of Jessup's Rangers
Biography on United Empire Loyalists' Association of Canada website

1735 births
1816 deaths
Canadian judges
Loyalists in the American Revolution from New York (state)
United Empire Loyalists
People from Stamford, Connecticut
People from Dutchess County, New York
People from Leeds and Grenville United Counties
History of Leeds and Grenville United Counties
19th-century Canadian judges